Warmth in the Wilderness is a tribute album to guitar virtuoso Jason Becker. It features many artists such as Paul Gilbert, Marty Friedman, Mike Campese, Anders Johansson, Lars-Eric Mattsson, Paul Nelson, Jeff Pilson and other groups as well. A second tribute album was released in 2002, with the title "Warmth in the Wilderness Vol. 2 - A Tribute to Jason Becker". Many songs were originally written by Jason Becker and David Lee Roth, before Becker was stricken with Lou Gehrig's disease.

Track listing

References

Tribute albums
2001 albums